The Arroceros Forest Park is a riverside urban forest park in Manila, Philippines, located on Antonio Villegas Street (former Calle Arroceros) in the central district of Ermita. 

Developed in 1993, the  park on the south bank of the Pasig River, at the foot of Quezon Bridge, consists of secondary growth forest with 61 different tree varieties and 8,000 ornamental plants providing a habitat for 10 different bird species. Despite its small size, it is considered an important feature of the city in providing fresh air to the Lawton area, which is traversed by many commuters from other cities in the region. It lies in a historic area of Manila and has been called "Manila's last lung", being the city's only nature park. The park is administered by the City Government of Manila in partnership with private environmental group, Winner Foundation.

History
The area occupied by the Arroceros Forest Park used to be part of Parián, the Chinese trading settlement during the early Spanish colonial period. In the 19th century, it was the site of the Fabrica de Arroceros, a tobacco factory owned and operated by the Compañía General de Tabacos de Filipinas. During the American period, it was used as a military garrison which housed the Signal Corps at the Cuartel de Infantería and the
Surgeon General's office at the Estado Mayor. When the Philippines gained independence after World War II, the barracks were converted into the headquarters of the Department of Education.

The park was established in 1993 after the government's education department offices were transferred to its present location in Pasig. Through a memorandum of agreement signed between the City of Manila and Winner Foundation supported by then First Lady Amelita Ramos, the city agreed to lease the site for development as a nature park by the private environmental group. With an initial 150 century-old trees that survived the war, the park now hosts over 3,000 trees through reforestation efforts spearheaded by the Manila Seedling Bank.

The park became the subject of controversy in 2003, when then mayor Lito Atienza ordered its closure to give way to the construction of a school administration building and teachers' dormitory on a portion of the park despite protests from conservation groups. The groups claimed that of the 8,000 trees in the park in 2000, only 2,000 remained when the buildings were completed. The park was reopened in 2007.

However, the memorandum of agreement signed earlier in the 1990s had expired a year later in 2008, leaving the park vulnerable to any future threats to its existence. A few years later, the park was threatened once again, when in July 2017, the Winner Foundation received an order from the Manila city government to vacate the park so that the city could build a gymnasium inside. This prompts the Winner Foundation and its partner groups to launch a signature campaign opposing the construction of the gym. An online Change.org petition made by a partner group urging the Senate Committee on Climate Change reached 115,000 signatures. The construction of the gym was eventually deferred by former mayor President Joseph Estrada.

Upon winning the mayoral election, Isko Moreno said he would not allow any construction from occurring in Arroceros Forest Park, vowing to block the impending construction of the gym made by the previous city administration.

On February 27, 2020, Mayor Isko Moreno signed City Ordinance No. 8607, or the Arroceros Forest Park Ordinance, designating the Arroceros Forest Park as a permanent forest park instead of as ordinary city property. Under this ordinance, cutting of trees, dumping of waste, and excavation is prohibited within the area. Alongside the ordinance, the mayor also revealed plans to allocate P1 million for the park's operations, to appoint "peace officers" to help in taking care of the park, and to expand the forest park as the highlight of a future green city in the Lawton area.

The park was formally reopened in February 2022 as the Arroceros Urban Forest Park after a redevelopment. The park which was 2.51 hectares was expanded by 5 hectares.

Description
The Arroceros Forest Park, designed by landscape architect Wilfrido Dizon and the Bulacan Garden Corporation, 
is home to over 3,500 trees of diverse variety, such as acacia mangium, acacia auriculiformis, African tulip tree, agoho, anahaw, banyan, bunga de china, dapdap, eucalyptus, ficus benjamina, fire tree, Indian tree, kamagong, mahogany, MacArthur palm, molave, narra, neem, rain tree, rattan, rubber tree, talisay, teak, tiesa and yucca. It is also inhabited by different fruit trees, including aratilis, avocado, banana, caimito, coconut, guava, macopa, mango, santol, as well as ornamental plants like calachuchi, gardenia, golden shower, palomaria and ylang-ylang. The park has tiled pathways and concrete roads giving access to areas around the park. It also contains a fish pond and bridge, as well as a riverside walk. The park is a habitat of different bird species, such as the long-tailed shrike, pied fantail, zebra dove, Pacific swallow, yellow-vented bulbul and brown shrike.

It also houses the Manila Education Center, the central offices for the Division of City Schools located at its southern edge.

Accessibility
The park is located in the center of Manila, just north of the Manila City Hall adjacent to the walled district of Intramuros. It is within walking distance from the LRT Line 1 Central Terminal station and is right across from the Manila Metropolitan Theater. It is accessible from Rizal Park and southern Manila via Padre Burgos Avenue, and from northern Manila via Quezon Boulevard and Quezon Bridge. It is also near the Lawton Bus Terminal and the Pasig River Ferry Lawton Station.

Gallery

References

Parks in Manila
Ermita
Tourist attractions in Manila
1993 establishments in the Philippines
Pasig River